The Dannenstern House is a historical building in the Old town of Riga, Latvia.

The house was built by and is named after Ernst Metsue von Dannenstern, a wealthy merchant. It dates from 1696 and is considered one of the finest examples of Baroque architecture in Riga. It was designed by German architect and chief architect of Riga Rupert Bindenschu. The street facade, in limestone, has giant order Corinthian pilasters and two elaborate entrance portals, created by sculptor D. Walter. The building also contains fragments of an earlier, medieval building.

References

External links
 
 Information about Dannenstern House from Riga Municipality 

Buildings and structures in Riga
Houses completed in 1696
1696 establishments in Europe
Baroque architecture in Latvia